Russellville is an unincorporated community in eastern Ray County, in the U.S. state of Missouri and part of the Kansas City metropolitan area. The community is eleven miles northeast of Richmond and 3.5 miles west of the  Ray-Carroll county line.

History
Russellville has the name of William Russell, an early settler. A variant name was "Fox". A post office called Fox was established in 1864, and remained in operation until 1904.

References

Unincorporated communities in Ray County, Missouri
Unincorporated communities in Missouri